Luke John Roberts (born 5 October 1977) is an English actor. He is known for his roles as Joseph Byrne in the BBC One medical drama Holby City (2006–2011, 2019–2022), Woodes Rogers in the Starz series Black Sails (2016–2017), and Eric Beaumont in the Global drama Ransom (2017–2019).

Roberts first gained prominence through his roles as Ryan Samson in the short-lived third series of the soap opera Crossroads (2003) and Captain Dan Pieterson in the Sky1 drama Mile High (2004–2005). In 2016, Roberts appeared in an episode of the HBO series Game of Thrones during the sixth season portraying Ser Arthur Dayne.

Filmography

Film

Television

Video Games

References

External links
 

1977 births
21st-century English male actors
English male film actors
English male soap opera actors
Living people
People educated at Woodbridge School
People from Woodbridge, Suffolk
Male actors from Suffolk